Artyom Yuryevich Semeykin (born 28 August 1996) is a Russian football player. He plays for FC Shinnik Yaroslavl.

Club career
He made his debut in the Russian Professional Football League for FC Energomash Belgorod on 20 July 2015 in a game against FC Torpedo Moscow.

He made his Russian Football National League debut for FC Nizhny Novgorod on 8 September 2018 in a game against FC Spartak-2 Moscow.

References

External links
 Profile by Russian Professional Football League

1996 births
People from Belgorod
Sportspeople from Belgorod Oblast
Living people
Russian footballers
Association football defenders
FC Energomash Belgorod players
FC Nizhny Novgorod (2015) players
FC Chayka Peschanokopskoye players
FC Tyumen players
FC Salyut Belgorod players
FC Tom Tomsk players
FC Shinnik Yaroslavl players
Russian First League players
Russian Second League players